Spurgeon's College is an evangelical Baptist theological college in South Norwood, London, UK. It is affiliated with the Baptist Union of Great Britain.

History
The school was founded in 1856 by Pastor Charles Spurgeon as "Pastors' College" in London. His vision was to provide a practical theological education, mission-centered. By 1892, the school had trained 863 students. In 1923, it moved to its present building and was renamed in honor of its founder.

Programs
It delivers training for the Baptist ministry both in the UK and elsewhere. It also offers a suite of other courses including online learning, a part-time (Monday) Degree course, several Master's courses. In 2008 the College was also accredited by the British Accreditation Council. In 2011 the College underwent three external inspections. A week-long inspection by the ecumenical churches (Quality in Formation) declared the College 'fit for purpose' and the University of Wales judged that the preparation for research degrees (MPhil, PhD) meets the current standards. Finally, the 2011 quinquennial review by the University resulted in a report recommending the programmes should continue subject to two conditions being met within months and other recommendations should be carefully considered.

Due to the University of Wales stopping the accreditation of outside institutes, their academic accreditation was withdrawn in 2012. In September 2012, the college announced that its degrees had received provisional accreditation by the University of Manchester, a member of the Russell Group of British universities subject to adjustments and negotiation. In 2020 the College announced a consultation period for a redevelopment programme as part of their vision to become a university. In May 2022 the College was granted full degree awarding powers by the Office for Students.

Partners 
The school is a partner of the Baptist Union of Great Britain and the Evangelical Alliance.

Notable alumni

 J. Sidlow Baxter, Australian born pastor and theologian who advocated a fundamentalist Christian theological perspective
 Dr George R. Beasley-Murray
Rev John Charles Carlile
 Rev Steve Chalke, founder of Oasis Trust, founder of Faithworks, chair of Stop the Traffik
 Nick Mercer, senior priest of the Anglican Diocese of London
 Arthur Gostick Shorrock, pioneer Baptist missionary in China for 40 years
 Dr Nigel G. Wright

References

External links
Spurgeon's College homepage

 
Baptist seminaries and theological colleges in the United Kingdom
Bible colleges, seminaries and theological colleges in England
Education in the London Borough of Croydon
Educational institutions established in 1856
Evangelicalism in the United Kingdom
Charities based in England
1856 establishments in England